The Aesthetic Mind: Philosophy and Psychology is a 2011 book edited by Elisabeth Schellekens and Peter Goldie. The contributors try to provide a new understanding of aesthetics and the experience of art based on philosophical reflections and evidence from empirical sciences.

Contributors

References

External links
The Aesthetic Mind

2011 non-fiction books
Aesthetics books
Oxford University Press books
Edited volumes